Azilal (in berber : ⴰⵣⵉⵍⴰⵍ) is a province in the Moroccan region of Béni Mellal-Khénifra. Its population in 2004 is 504,501.

The major cities and towns are:

 Afourar
 Azilal
 Ait Attab
 Bzou
 Demnate
 Foum Jamaa
 Ouaouizeght

Subdivisions
The province is divided administratively into the following:

References

 
Azilal Province